If You Give a Mouse a Cookie is a children's book written by Laura Numeroff and illustrated by Felicia Bond, first published in 1985 by Harper and Row. Described as a "circular tale", illustrating a slippery slope, it is Numeroff and Bond's first collaboration in what came to be the If You Give... series.

Plot

The entire story is told in second person. A boy named Oliver gives a cookie to a mouse named Quinley . The mouse asks for a glass of milk. He then requests a straw (to drink the milk), a mirror (to avoid a milk mustache), nail scissors (to trim his hair in the mirror), and a broom (to sweep up his hair trimmings). Next, he wants to take a nap, have a story read to him, draw a picture, and hang the drawing on the refrigerator. Looking at the refrigerator makes him thirsty, so the mouse asks for a glass of milk. The circle is complete when he wants a cookie to go with it.

Art

The text was interpreted by illustrator Felicia Bond to show the increasing energy of the mouse, with the little boy being run ragged by the end of the story. The art was praised by School Library Journal for its "meticulous attention to detail", and was executed with vibrant colors of blended pencil in a complex process of layering magenta, cyan, yellow, and black on separate sheets, which were then assembled during printing.

Bond describes rushing to get the sketches done before leaving town with her boyfriend, and that the energy of the mouse evolved from that excitement. She has mentioned on numerous occasions that the little boy in the book was her boyfriend, Stephen Roxburgh, as a child.

In popular culture

If You Give a Mouse a Cookie quickly became established as a popular favorite and is today considered a contemporary classic. A series of seventeen titles followed. They have been translated into more than thirteen languages. The If You Give... series has garnered numerous awards, and their popularity is witnessed by their consistent presence on The New York Times Best Seller List.

Charles Schulz created two Peanuts strips about If You Give a Mouse a Cookie, and in 2000 Oprah Winfrey chose If You Give a Pig a Pancake as one of her favorite things in 2000. She also included it on her list Oprah's Favorite Things from A-Z in that same year. "If You Give a Moose a Muffin" was the answer to a question on Jeopardy!. The books have been adapted into plays for children's theaters. The Bronx Zoo in New York featured the art in their Children's Zoo for one year and the artwork has been used to create murals in the wings of children's hospitals. The series has fans of all ages from all over the world including Japan, where an entire Tokyo city bus was painted with images of Mouse. Mouse also made it to the White House; in Laura Bush's Celebration of American Authors at the 2001 Presidential Inauguration Felicia Bond and Laura Numeroff were among those honored for their If You Give... series, and the former First Lady writes that the Bush family cat India's favorite book was If You Take a Mouse to the Movies. A bronze sculpture of her sleeping on the book is included in the George W. Bush Presidential Library. First Lady Michelle Obama read If You Give a Mouse a Cookie on the White House lawn during the 2009 Easter Egg Roll.

The book itself was featured in an episode of Kino's Storytime, and appeared as part of a "Mail Time" segment on the Blue's Clues episode "Blue's ABCs".

If You Give... series

If You Give a Mouse a Cookie (November 1985) 
If You Give a Moose a Muffin (March 1991)
If You Give a Pig a Pancake (February 1998)
The Best Mouse Cookie (July 1999)
If You Take a Mouse to the Movies (May 2000)
If You Take a Mouse to School (September 2002)
If You Give a Pig a Party (April 2004)
Merry Christmas, Mouse! (August 2007)
Time for School, Mouse! (2008)
If You Give a Cat a Cupcake (2008)
Happy Valentine's Day, Mouse! (2009)
Happy Easter, Mouse! (2010)
If You Give a Dog a Donut (2011)
It's Pumpkin Day, Mouse! (2012)
Happy Birthday, Mouse! (2012)
If You Give a Mouse a Brownie (2016)

Compilations
 (2006)
If You Take a Mouse to the Movies, A Special Christmas Edition (2010)

Series awards

The book series was also awarded an Honoree "Laura Bush Celebrates American Authors" in 2001 plus Presidential Inauguration "NEA Teacher’s Picks Books to Read Across America" in 1999.

Selected translations
 Kekse für die Maus im Haus (1985, German)
 Souris, tu veux un biscuit? (1986, French)
 Ru guo ni gei lao shu chi bing gan (1993, Chinese)
 Si le das una galletita a un ratón (1995, Spanish)
 Im titen ʻugiyah la-ʻakhbar (1997, Hebrew)
 Se dai un biscotto a un topo (1997, Italian)
 Moshi mo nezumi ni kukkī o ageru to (1999, Japanese)
 Yao shi ni gei lao shu chi bing gan (2005, Chinese)
 Если дать мышонку печенье (2012, Russian, . However, it was published at least as early as 1991 in the children's magazine Трамвай (The Tram))

Adaptations
An animated series adaptation of If You Give a Mouse a Cookie was released on Amazon Prime on November 7, 2017.

References

Further reading

External links
 Publisher's official site
 Mouse Cookie Books
 Economics lesson planfrom Economics and Children's Literature: Supplement 2 (St. Louis, MO: SPEC Publishers, 1998) 

1985 children's books
American children's books
American picture books
Series of children's books
Books about mice and rats
Books about cats
Books about dogs
Books about pigs
Fictional deer and moose
Cookies in popular culture
Harper & Row books